Chara Charalambous (born 24 March 2000) is a Cypriot footballer who plays as a forward for First Division club Lefkothea Latsion and the Cyprus women's national team.

Career
Charalambous has been capped for the Cyprus national team, appearing for the team during the UEFA Women's Euro 2021 qualifying cycle.

References

External links
 
 

2000 births
Living people
Women's association football forwards
Cypriot women's footballers
Cyprus women's international footballers